The 1924–25 Idaho Vandals men's basketball team represented the University of Idaho during the  NCAA college basketball season. Members of the Pacific Coast Conference, the Vandals were led by fifth-year head coach  and played their home games on campus at the Armory and Gymnasium in Moscow, Idaho.

References

External links
Sports Reference – Idaho Vandals: 1924–25 basketball season
Gem of the Mountains: 1925 University of Idaho yearbook – 1924–25 basketball season
Idaho Argonaut – student newspaper – 1925 editions

Idaho Vandals men's basketball seasons
Idaho
Idaho
Idaho